Navlakha Palace, also known as Rajnagar Palace, is a royal Brahmin palace in the town of Rajnagar, near Madhubani in Bihar, India. The palace was built by Maharaja Rameshwar Singh of Darbhanga.

History
It was built by Rameshwar Singh, the younger brother of Maharajah Of Darbhanga, between 1884 and 1929 to serve as the Darbhanga Raj's administrative capital. It includes 11 temples to gods and goddesses and several forts and palaces. It suffered significant damage during the 1934 Bihar–Nepal earthquake and has never been rebuilt.

Architecture
Up to 22 layers of carving were used in the construction of the monument, greater than the Taj Mahal, which has a maximum of 15 layers. Its Kali temple is made of ivory and white marble that resembles the Taj Mahal. The portico has arches standing on four elephants built from cement and is allegedly one of the first cement structures in India. The oldest surviving Mithila painting is found in the Gasauni Ghar (the room where the family deity is kept) of the palace. Made in 1919 on the occasion of the Maharaja's daughter's wedding, there are very few written or photographic records of the palace.

Present condition
The palace is currently owned by the Raj Darbhanga
. Following the 1934 earthquake, it was never repaired. It is continually suffering from encroachment. Locals have long demanded that it be turned into a tourist site.

See also
 Nargona Palace
 Darbhanga Fort
 Anand Bagh Palace
 Rohtasgarh Fort
 Munger Fort

References

External links
 http://songs.surtall.com/raja_darbhanga_maithili_article.php
 https://www.business-standard.com/article/pti-stories/documentary-puts-spotlight-on-ruins-of-raj-darbhanga-s-famed-palace-in-bihar-119042100157_1.html
 https://www.livehindustan.com/bihar/madhubani/story-madhubani-rajnagar-raj-complex-could-not-be-buuilt-yet-1669881.html
 https://www.livehindustan.com/bihar/madhubani/story-rajnagar-raj-campus-can-not-improve-2445776.html
 http://www.catchnews.com/patna-news/biharpolls-rajnagar-home-to-the-oldest-surviving-madhubani-painting-1446630681.html

Palaces in Bihar
Tourist attractions in Madhubani district